Melvin Ingram III (born April 26, 1989) is an American football outside linebacker who is a free agent. He played college football at South Carolina, and earned All-American honors.  He was selected by the San Diego Chargers in the first round with the 18th overall pick of the 2012 NFL Draft. He has also played for the Pittsburgh Steelers and the Kansas City Chiefs.

Early years
Ingram was born and raised in Hamlet, North Carolina. He attended Richmond Senior High School in Rockingham, North Carolina. As a senior linebacker, he recorded 87 tackles and 2.5 sacks.

College career
Ingram attended the University of South Carolina, where he played for coach Steve Spurrier's South Carolina Gamecocks football team from 2007 to 2011. He played linebacker for the Gamecocks before switching to defensive end.  As a junior in 2010, he led the team with nine sacks.

In 2011, Ingram registered 10 sacks, 15 tackles for loss, and two interceptions. He also scored three touchdowns. Two of his touchdowns came against Georgia in a 45–42 victory in Athens, including a 68-yard fake-punt for a touchdown. Ingram's strong senior campaign helped propel the Gamecocks defense to a final #4 national poll ranking, and he was a first-team All-Southeastern Conference (SEC) selection, and was recognized as a consensus All-American.

Professional career

San Diego / Los Angeles Chargers
Ingram was selected by the San Diego Chargers with the 18th overall pick in the 1st round of the 2012 NFL Draft. In his rookie campaign, Ingram racked up 18 quarterback pressures, tied for second-most on the squad, along with 12 special teams tackles, which tied for the team lead. He played in all 16 games, with two starts.

On May 14, 2013, Ingram tore his anterior cruciate ligament during the Chargers' organized team activities and was expected to miss the entire 2013 season. On August 26, 2013, he was placed on the Reserve/Physically Unable to Perform (PUP) list. On December 7, 2013, Ingram was activated off the PUP list prior to Week 14. In Week 16, Ingram sacked Raiders quarterback Matt McGloin while forcing a fumble. In the wild card game against the Cincinnati Bengals, Ingram picked off quarterback Andy Dalton for his first postseason interception. On October 4, 2015, Ingram strip-sacked Josh McCown and recovered the fumble.

On February 27, 2017, the Chargers placed the franchise tag on Ingram. On June 11, 2017, Ingram signed a four-year, $66 million contract with $42 million guaranteed with the Chargers. Ingram earned the AFC Defensive Player of the Month for September 2017 after recording 5.5 sacks, including a three-sack game against the Chiefs in Week 3. He finished the season with 56 combined tackles and 10.5 sacks. Ingram was selected to his first career Pro Bowl after the 2017 season, replacing teammate Joey Bosa. He was ranked 76th by his peers on the NFL Top 100 Players of 2018.

Prior to the start of the 2018 NFL season, Ingram predicted that the Chargers would win Super Bowl LIII and he said that "We're ready. We've got to bring a Super Bowl to the city."  He also said that "I was taught you've got to speak stuff into existence. If you want to do something, you've got to say you're going to do it and then you've got to go do it." In the end, Ingram and the Chargers failed to make it to the Super Bowl when they lost to the eventual Super Bowl champion New England Patriots by a score of 41-28 in the divisional round of the playoffs. On June 17, 2019, Ingram predicted that the Chargers would win Super Bowl LIV and stated that “We’re the team to beat in the NFL, not just the AFC West, it’s the NFL. We feel like when we’re going against our offense that we need to beat them because they’re the best. They need to beat us because we’re the best. That’s how we’re going to get better.” In the end, the 2019 Chargers not only failed to go to the Super Bowl, but missed the playoffs entirely after posting a 5-11 record.

On September 26, 2020, Ingram was placed on injured reserve with a knee injury. He was activated on October 24, 2020. He was placed back on injured reserve on November 27, 2020, with a knee injury.

Pittsburgh Steelers
On July 20, 2021, Ingram signed a one-year contract with the Pittsburgh Steelers.

Kansas City Chiefs
Ingram was traded to the Kansas City Chiefs on November 2, 2021 in exchange for a sixth-round selection in the 2022 NFL Draft.

Miami Dolphins
On May 18, 2022, the Miami Dolphins signed Ingram to a contract.

NFL career statistics

References

External links

 
 Los Angeles Chargers bio
 South Carolina Gamecocks bio

1989 births
Living people
African-American players of American football
All-American college football players
American football defensive ends
American football linebackers
Los Angeles Chargers players
Pittsburgh Steelers players
Kansas City Chiefs players
Miami Dolphins players
People from Hamlet, North Carolina
Players of American football from North Carolina
San Diego Chargers players
South Carolina Gamecocks football players
American Conference Pro Bowl players
21st-century African-American sportspeople
20th-century African-American people